Pál Teleki (born 5 March 1906, died in 1985) was a Hungarian footballer who played for Hungary in the 1934 FIFA World Cup and a manager. He also played for Romanian clubs AMEF Arad and Chinezul Timişoara, and once turned out for the Romanian national side. He later played for Hungarian outfit Bocskai FC.

Honours
Chinezul Timişoara
Liga I: 1926–27
Bocskai FC
Hungarian Cup: 1929–30

References

1906 births
Sportspeople from Arad, Romania
People from the Kingdom of Hungary
Hungarian footballers
Romanian footballers
Hungary international footballers
Romania international footballers
Dual internationalists (football)
1934 FIFA World Cup players
Association football forwards
Vagonul Arad players
Debreceni VSC players
Liga I players
Nemzeti Bajnokság I players
Hungarian football managers
Romanian football managers
Diósgyőri VTK managers
1985 deaths